The Canon de 24 C modèle 1876 was a coastal defense gun designed and built before World War I.  A number of guns were also converted to railway guns during World War I in order to meet a need for heavy artillery.

Design
The Canon de 24 C modèle 1876 were typical built-up guns of the period with mixed construction consisting of a rifled steel liner and several layers of iron reinforcing hoops.  In French service guns of mixed steel/iron construction were designated in centimeters while all steel guns were designated in millimeters.  However, reference materials do not always distinguish the difference in construction and use either unit of measurement.  The guns used a de Bange breech and fired separate loading bagged charges  and  projectiles.

The mle 1876 was mounted on a number of different models of garrison mounts with limited traverse.  One exception was the GPC mount (côte sur affût type Guerre à Pivot Central) which was a rectangular steel firing platform which sat on top of a large circular steel track embedded in concrete behind a parapet. A rectangular steel firing platform with four wheels rotated on the track and gave 360° of traverse.

The recoil system for the mle 1876 consisted of a U shaped gun cradle which held the trunnioned barrel and a slightly inclined firing platform with a hydro-gravity recoil system.  When the gun fired the hydraulic buffers slowed the recoil of the cradle which slid up a set of inclined rails on the firing platform and then returned the gun to position by the combined action of the buffers and gravity.

Railway guns
In order to address a need for heavy artillery a number of mle 1876 guns were converted to railway guns and given the designation 24 cm Canon G modèle 1916.  The conversion entailed removing the gun cradle from its carriage and mounting it on a variety of flatbed rail wagons built from steel I beams and timbers on top of a two, three or four-axle rail bogie.  The gun carriage changed from an inclined hydro-gravity system to a horizontal hydro-spring system where the recoil was absorbed by a hydraulic buffer and returned to firing position by springs.  At the front of the carriage there was also an attachment for an earth anchor and between the axles there were screw jacks which could be lowered to take weight off the axles and anchor the carriage.  Elevation stayed the same but there was no traverse.  The guns either had to be removed from the tracks and put on a wooden firing platform and levered into place or drawn across a section of curved track to aim.  Beginning in 1916 twenty-four guns were assigned to French artillery units, thirteen were assigned to French training units and sixteen were assigned to artillery units of the US Army.

Siege artillery
In addition to its coastal artillery role, an unknown number of guns were used as siege artillery during the First World War.

Photo Gallery

References

240 mm artillery
Artillery of France
Coastal artillery
World War I artillery of France
World War I guns